Voglia di volare is an italian miniseries (1984) starring Gianni Morandi and Claude Jade.

The pilot Davide has left his wife Barbara. Davide's father, a stubborn farmer, had never accepted his german daughter-in-law, Barbara. As Adreina, the daughter of the separated couple flees to her father, understands this, how much he loves Barbara yet. Daughter Adreina has yet rid Davide's new flame Valeria rid. Then Barbara, now engagaged to an brutal US-General, Steve, emerges.

Cast
Gianni Morandi: Davide
Claude Jade: Barbara
Linda Celani: Adreina
Daniela Poggi: Valeria
Jacques Dufilho: Davide's father
Anna Campori: Davide's mother
John Armstead: Steve
Isabelle Spade: Cristina
Christian Borromeo: Dirk
Stephan Rafi: Stefano
Dario Casalini: Dirk's brother

Italian television miniseries